Tiffany Welford (born 12 April 1985) is an Australian former professional tennis player.

Her highest singles ranking by the WTA is 276, which she reached on 7 February 2005. Her career-high in doubles is 478, achieved on 11 May 2009.

She was absent from the tour from March 2005 to April 2008 due to chronic injury. She is nicknamed "TJ". Her younger sister Julianne ("JT") competed on the junior tour.

ITF finals

Singles (1–0)

Doubles (1–4)

External links
 
 
 

1985 births
Living people
Australian female tennis players
Sportspeople from Jakarta
People from the Sunshine Coast, Queensland
Tennis people from Queensland